Niels Otto Møller (7 November 1897 – 14 April 1966) was a Danish sailor who competed in the 1928 Summer Olympics.

In 1928 he won the silver medal as crew member of the Danish boat Hi-Hi in the 6 metre class competition.

References

External links
 
 
 

1897 births
1966 deaths
Danish male sailors (sport)
Olympic sailors of Denmark
Olympic silver medalists for Denmark
Olympic medalists in sailing
Sailors at the 1928 Summer Olympics – 6 Metre
Medalists at the 1928 Summer Olympics